Teo Otto Theater  is a theatre in Remscheid, North Rhine-Westphalia, Germany.

Theatres in North Rhine-Westphalia